WWE Money in the Bank is a professional wrestling pay-per-view (PPV) and livestreaming event, produced annually since 2010 by WWE, the world's largest professional wrestling promotion. The event is named after the Money in the Bank ladder match, which had originally only taken place at WrestleMania. The Money in the Bank ladder match debuted at WrestleMania 21 in April 2005 and was featured at the next five WrestleMania events. Following WrestleMania XXVI in March 2010, the match concept was spun off into its own PPV beginning in July that year, with the match no longer occurring at WrestleMania. In addition to PPV, the event has aired on the WWE Network since 2014 and Peacock since 2021. In August 2021, the event became recognized as one of the company's five biggest events of the year, along with the Royal Rumble, WrestleMania, SummerSlam, and Survivor Series, referred to as the "Big Five".

From 2010 to 2013, the event occupied the July slot of WWE's pay-per-view calendar before moving to June from 2014 to 2018, after which, it was held in May before returning to its original July slot in 2021. 
The event was introduced during WWE's first brand extension period, and the events in 2010 and 2011 featured wrestlers from both the Raw and SmackDown brands. The first brand split then ended in August 2011. In mid-2016, the brand extension was reinstated and the 2017 event was held exclusively for SmackDown. However, following WrestleMania 34 in April 2018, brand-exclusive pay-per-views were discontinued. The 2023 event will be held in London, England, thus making it the first event to take place outside of the United States. While the eponymous match was originally only for male wrestlers, the 2017 event featured the first-ever women's version and the events since have featured two matches, one each for the men and women.

Concept and history
The "Money in the Bank" pay-per-view (PPV) centers around a ladder match, the prize of which is a briefcase containing a contract for a championship match. The winner can then cash in the contract at a time and place of their choosing anytime within the next year – beginning the night they win the briefcase. If the contract is not used within that year, it is voided, but this has yet to happen. Only the holder of the Money in the Bank contract can be the one to cash-in the contract.

In 2005, World Wrestling Entertainment (WWE) established the Money in the Bank ladder match as an annual match at their marquee event, WrestleMania, debuting at WrestleMania 21. The idea for the match was conceptualized by then-WWE wrestler Chris Jericho and former WWE writer Brian Gewirtz. Following WrestleMania XXVI in March 2010, WWE established a separate Money in the Bank event as a gimmick PPV; the match subsequently ceased being held at WrestleMania. The inaugural event was held on July 18, 2010, at the Sprint Center in Kansas City, Missouri.

In 2010 and 2011, the annual pay-per-views included two Money in the Bank ladder matches. To coincide with the brand extension, one ladder match was for wrestlers from the Raw brand with a match contract for the brand's WWE Championship, while the other ladder match was for the SmackDown brand with a match contract for its World Heavyweight Championship. In April 2011, WWE ceased using its full name with the WWE abbreviation becoming an orphaned initialism. The brand split then ended in August 2011; although the brand split ended, the Money in the Bank pay-per-views continued to have two ladder matches for match contracts for the respective titles. After the two titles were unified in December 2013, a championship match contract for the unified WWE World Heavyweight Championship became the prize of a single Money in the Bank ladder match. Also in 2014, the event moved to the June slot and it was also the first Money in the Bank event to air on WWE's online streaming service, the WWE Network, in addition to traditional PPV outlets. The brand split returned after the 2016 event, but the 2017 pay-per-view was SmackDown-exclusive. The championship match contract in the ladder match was for SmackDown's WWE Championship (formerly WWE World Heavyweight Championship). The 2017 event also featured the first-ever women's Money in the Bank ladder match with its contract being for a SmackDown Women's Championship match; each event since has featured a men's and women's match.

The 2017 event would be the only Money in the Bank PPV to be brand-exclusive, as following WrestleMania 34 in April 2018, brand-exclusive pay-per-views were discontinued, thus the events since have involved both the Raw and SmackDown brands. Beginning with the 2018 event, the ladder matches had eight participants evenly divided between the brands. The 2018 contracts granted the winners a championship match for their respective brand's world championship: the Universal Championship or WWE Championship, and the Raw Women's Championship or SmackDown Women's Championship.  Beginning with the 2019 event, the winners can choose either brand's championship. The 2019 event also moved Money in the Bank to the May slot in WWE's pay-per-view calendar.

Due to the COVID-19 pandemic in 2020, that year's event saw the number of competitors in both matches decreased to six. Additionally, while the rules of the match itself remained the same, a new "Corporate Ladder" gimmick was also added to the matches, in which the participants had to travel from the ground floor of WWE Global Headquarters to the roof in order to reach the briefcases, which were suspended above a ring on the roof. Additionally for 2020, both the men's and women's matches took place at the same time. While the ladder matches were pre-recorded as cinematic matches, all of the other matches took place live from the WWE Performance Center in Orlando, Florida, with no fans in attendance. Additionally, the 2020 event was the first event to directly award a championship for winning the Money in the Bank ladder match; on the following night's episode of Raw, it was revealed that the women's ladder match had actually been for the Raw Women's Championship due to reigning champion Becky Lynch going on maternity leave.

In August 2020, WWE began holding Raw and SmackDown's shows in a bio-secure bubble called the WWE ThunderDome. In May 2021, the company announced that they would be leaving the ThunderDome and returning to live touring, beginning with the July 16 episode of SmackDown in Houston, Texas. The 2021 Money in the Bank was in turn announced to take place at Dickies Arena in Fort Worth, Texas on July 18—returning the event to its original July slot—thus it was the first WWE pay-per-view held outside of Florida since Elimination Chamber on March 8, 2020, and the first pay-per-view held following the end of the ThunderDome Era. The 2021 event also reverted to the standard version of the titular ladder matches as well as returning to having eight competitors for both matches, evenly divided between the two brands. The 2021 event was also the first Money in the Bank to air on Peacock's WWE Network channel, following the merger of the American version of the WWE Network under Peacock in March that year.

The 2022 event was announced during the 2021 SummerSlam, which was held at the Allegiant Stadium in the Las Vegas suburb of Paradise, Nevada. Money in the Bank was initially announced to be held at the same venue on July 2, 2022, which would have marked the first time for a Money in the Bank event to be held in a National Football League stadium. However, on May 26, 2022, it was announced that the event had been moved to the nearby MGM Grand Garden Arena, although still on the same date, thus marking the first Money in the Bank to be held on a Saturday. While Money in the Bank had been established as one of WWE's monthly PPVs held between their "Big Four" shows (Royal Rumble, WrestleMania, SummerSlam, and Survivor Series), in August 2021, WWE President and Chief Revenue Officer Nick Khan referred to Money in the Bank as one of the company's "five annual tentpoles", thus elevating the event's status as one of WWE's five biggest events of the year, referred to as the "Big Five". The 2022 event also reduced the number of participants in the women's match to seven with an uneven division of wrestlers between the two brands—it featured four wrestlers from Raw and three from SmackDown; the men's match was originally announced with just seven, but during the event, it was expanded to eight participants, evenly divided between the two brands. Also beginning with the 2022 event, the winner can use the contract on any championship.

On January 5, 2023, WWE announced that the 2023 event would be held on Saturday, July 1 at The O2 Arena in London, England, marking the first Money in the Bank event to be held outside of the United States. This will also be WWE's first major event to be held in London since Insurrextion in May 2002.

Theme song
Money in the Bank is the only WWE pay-per-view event with a regular theme song. This is in stark contrast to WWE's other pay-per-view events, which use songs sponsored by mainstream recording artists, which was the case with the first event using "Money" by I Fight Dragons. From 2011 to 2018, "Money in the Bank" by former in-house WWE composer Jim Johnston was used as the event's theme song. Before the advent of the pay-per-view, Johnston's song was used as the entrance music for Donald Trump for his numerous guest appearances on WWE television. Since 2019, the theme song for event has been "Gotta Get That", written by WWE's current in-house composer def rebel.

Events and winners

Notes

References

External links

 
Recurring events established in 2010